The following is a list of nude events (clothing-free events) where people can be naked in public:

Generic events 
 Naked party
 Nude wedding

Specific events 
 Burning Man
 Fusion Festival
 Miss and Mr. Nude America
 Naked Pumpkin Run
 Nakukymppi
 Primal Scream, a semesterly tradition at Harvard College
 World Naked Bike Ride
 World Naked Gardening Day

See also
Dick Bacon
Nude recreation
List of places where social nudity is practised

Sex festivals
 
Naturism
Cultural lists
Lists of events